Luka Majcen (born 25 July 1989) is a Slovenian professional footballer who plays as a striker for RoundGlass Punjab.

Club career

Early career
Majcen started his senior career with Interblock.

Churchill Brothers
In 2020, Majcen moved to India and signed with Churchill Brothers in the I-League. He was the second best goalscorer of the 2020–21 I-League season with 11 goals in 15 matches.

Bengaluru United
In August 2021, Majcen moved to I-League 2nd Division side Bengaluru United. He made his debut on 6 September in a 1–0 win against Central Reserve Police Force in the group stage of the 2021 Durand Cup, but their journey ended with a 4–2 defeat to Mohammedan Sporting in the semi-finals.

With Bengaluru United, he won the 2021–22 Bangalore Super Division title, in which he emerged as the league's top scorer with thirteen goals.

Gokulam Kerala
On 9 January 2022, it was announced that I-League defending champions Gokulam Kerala have signed Majcen for the remainder of the season.

On 3 March 2022, he made his debut for the club in I-League match against NEROCA, which ended in a 0–0 stalemate. Majcen scored his first goals for Gokulam Kerala on 7 March, in their 5–1 win against Real Kashmir. He scored his first hat-trick on 12 March in their 6–2 win against Kenkre. With Gokulam Kerala, Majcen won the league title in the 2021–22 season, defeating Mohammedan Sporting 2–1 in the final game at the Salt Lake Stadium on 14 May, as Gokulam became the first club in fifteen years to defend the title. Overall, Majcen scored thirteen league goals during the season.

In the 2022 AFC Cup group stage opener, Majcen scored a brace in Gokulam's 4–2 win against ATK Mohun Bagan. He also appeared in the remaining two matches when Gokulam was defeated 1–0 by Maldivian side Maziya S&RC, and 2–1 by Bashundhara Kings of Bangladesh, respectively, and was eliminated from the tournament.

RoundGlass Punjab
On 23 September 2022, Majcen joined another I-League side RoundGlass Punjab on a one-year deal. With Punjab, Majcen won the 2022–23 I-League title, his second consecutive I-League championship, and helped the team gain promotion to the Indian Super League. He was also named the player of the season and was the league's top scorer with 16 goals.

Career statistics

Club

Honours
Interblock
Slovenian Cup: 2007–08, 2008–09
Slovenian Supercup: 2008

Triglav Kranj
Slovenian Second League: 2016–17

Churchill Brothers
I-League runner-up: 2020–21

Bengaluru United
Bangalore Super Division: 2021–22

Gokulam Kerala
I-League: 2021–22

RoundGlass Punjab
I-League: 2022–23

Individual
 I-League Player of the Season: 2022–23
 I-League top scorer: 2022–23

References

External links
Luka Majcen at Sofascore

NZS profile 

1989 births
Living people
Slovenian footballers
Association football forwards
Slovenian PrvaLiga players
Slovenian Second League players
I-League players
NK IB 1975 Ljubljana players
NK Ivančna Gorica players
NK Rudar Velenje players
FC Koper players
NK Triglav Kranj players
ND Gorica players
NK Krka players
Churchill Brothers FC Goa players
FC Bengaluru United players
Gokulam Kerala FC players
RoundGlass Punjab FC players
Slovenia youth international footballers
Slovenia under-21 international footballers
Slovenian expatriate footballers
Slovenian expatriate sportspeople in India
Expatriate footballers in India